Joseph William Corfield (8 March 1895 – 7 November 1970) was an Australian rules footballer who played with Richmond in the Victorian Football League (VFL).

Notes

External links 
		

1895 births
1970 deaths
Australian rules footballers from Victoria (Australia)
Richmond Football Club players
Australian military personnel of World War I